The historic buildings of the United Kingdom date from prehistoric times onwards. The earliest are Neolithic buildings and these are followed by those of ancient, medieval and modern times, all exemplifying the architecture of the United Kingdom. Below is a list of important buildings and structures from the beginning until Georgian times (18th and early 19th centuries).

Pre-historic buildings and structures

Roman buildings and structures

Anglo-Saxon, Celtic and Viking buildings and structures

Approximately 5th century to the Norman Conquest of 1066.

Norman architecture

11th and 12th centuries.

Early Gothic architecture

Late 12th century until the mid to late 13th century.

Decorated and Perpendicular Gothic architecture

Late 13th century until the mid 16th century.

Renaissance, Tudor and Jacobean architecture

Late 15th century until the mid 17th century.

Caroline and interregnum architecture

English Baroque architecture

Georgian architecture 

Around 1720 to around 1840.

See also 

 Anglo-Saxon architecture
 Architecture of the United Kingdom
 Prehistoric Britain
 Roman Britain
 Timeline of architectural styles
 List of country houses in the United Kingdom
 Nikolaus Pevsner

References 

Buildings
Cultural history of the United Kingdom
Lists of buildings and structures in the United Kingdom